The Mongrel is a 2012 Italian thriller-drama film.  It marked the directorial debut of actor  Alessandro Gassmann, who also co-wrote the script and starred in the film.

For his performance Gassmann won the Globo d'oro for best actor. The film was nominated for two David di Donatello, for best new director and for best original song ("La vita possibile"), and also received three nominations at Nastri d'Argento Awards,  for best cinematography, best new director and best score.

Cast  
 Alessandro Gassmann as  Roman
  Giovanni Anzaldo as  Nicu
  Manrico Gammarota as  Geco
  Sergio Meogrossi as Talebano
  Matteo Taranto as  Dragos
 Mădălina Diana Ghenea as  Dorina
 Michele Placido as  Avv. Silvestri
 Maiga Bailkissa as Lourdes
  Carolina Facchinetti as  Chiara 
  Nadia Rinaldi as Maddalena

See also  
 List of Italian films of 2012

References

External links

2012 thriller drama films
2012 films
2012 directorial debut films
Films about immigration
Italian thriller drama films
2012 drama films
2010s Italian films